Stephen Stills Live is a live album by Stephen Stills, released on Atlantic Records in 1975. Recorded on his first solo tour since 1971 and released after he had signed to Columbia Records. It peaked at number 42 on the US charts.

Background and recording 
Taken from live recordings in 1974, it was issued by Atlantic Records after Stills had left the label for Columbia Records. It peaked at #42 on the Billboard 200, and is currently out of print. It was recorded during his first solo tour in three years after the break up of Manassas. Atlantic recorded both nights of Stills' concerts at Auditorium Theatre, Chicago, for a potential live album. Tom Dowd mixed the album in November 1975 at Caribou Ranch. The first side of the album is Stills with an electric band, and the second side of the album is Stills on his own playing acoustically. "Four Days Gone" and "Special Care" are songs written by Stills and recorded by Buffalo Springfield. He combined the Manassas song "Jet Set (Sigh)" with Joe Walsh's similarly sounding hit "Rocky Mountain Way" on the electric side. On the acoustic side he did a cover of Robert Johnson's "Crossroads" segueing into Chuck Berry's "You Can't Catch Me". Also included is the first release of Stills' cover of Fred Neil's "Everybody's Talkin' at Me" which had been recorded, but not released for the debut Crosby Stills & Nash album.

Track listing

Personnel
Side One: Electric Side
 Stephen Stills - vocals, guitar, piano
 Donnie Dacus - guitar, backing vocals
 Jerry Aiello - keyboards
 Kenny Passarelli - bass, backing vocals
 Russ Kunkel - drums
 Joe Lala - percussion
Side Two: Acoustic Side
 Stephen Stills - vocals & acoustic guitar
Technical personnel
Tom Dowd, Don Gehmen, & Michael John Bowen - Mixed and edited Oct 1975 at Caribou Ranch, Nederland, Colorado
Recorded live by Bill Halverson
Photography - Stephen Sanders
Management, Cover Concept and Design - Michael John Bowen

Charts

Tour 
The Stephen Stills 1974 Theater Tour was a concert tour by American musician Stephen Stills. It was his first solo tour since 1971, and the first since the demise of his band Manassas. He played well respected theaters across the Mid West and the East Coast of the United States. This was Stills' first solo tour in three years, a low-key affair that started with an electric set, then an acoustic set and finishing with another electric set. The setlist contained a range of material from his Buffalo Springfield days, his first two solo albums and the CSN/Y songs. It was during this tour that Stills announced the CSNY 1974 reunion tour. A live album Stephen Stills Live was recorded during the Chicago Auditorium dates and released in December 1975. On the 22 February date in Washington, Neil Young joined Stills on stage.

References 

Stephen Stills live albums
1975 live albums
Atlantic Records live albums